Perrierbambus is a genus of Madagascan bamboo in the grass family.

The genus name of Perrierbambus is in honour of Joseph Marie Henry Alfred Perrier de la Bâthie (1873–1958), a French botanist who specialized in the plants of Madagascar. It was first described and published in Bull. Soc. Bot. France Vol.71 on pages 699-700 in 1924.

Species
 Perrierbambus madagascariensis A. Camus
 Perrierbambus tsarasaotrensis A. Camus

References

External links

Bambusoideae
Bambusoideae genera
Endemic flora of Madagascar
Plants described in 1924
Taxa named by Aimée Antoinette Camus